Luzhniki is a station on the Moscow Central Circle of the Moscow Metro that opened in September 2016.

Name
It is named for the nearby Luzhniki Olympic Complex.

Transfer
Passengers may make out-of-station transfers to Sportivnaya station on the Sokolnicheskaya Line, across Khamovnichesky Val.

Gallery

External links 
 mkzd.ru

Moscow Metro stations
Railway stations in Russia opened in 2016
Moscow Central Circle stations